Rich Parent (born March 29, 1973) is a Canadian former professional ice hockey goaltender who played 32 games in the National Hockey League (NHL) with the St. Louis Blues, Tampa Bay Lightning and Pittsburgh Penguins between 1997 and 2001.

Playing career
Born in Montreal, Quebec, Parent began his junior career in the Western Hockey League (WHL) as the goalie of the Spokane Chiefs. After one year with the Chiefs, Parent turned professional when he joined the Muskegon Fury of the Colonial Hockey League (CoHL). During the 1995–96 season, Parent was a CoHL first team All-Star, named the CoHL Most Outstanding Goalie, and also played 19 games with the Detroit Vipers of the International Hockey League and 2 games with the Rochester Americans of the American Hockey League. The following season Parent played full-time with the Vipers and led them to a Turner Cup victory. The St. Louis Blues signed Parent to a contract following the season and Parent made his debut in the NHL, playing for 12 minutes in a game for the Blues.

For the 1998–99 season Parent split the year between the Blues and the Worcester IceCats, the Blues' minor league affiliate. During the season, he was injured by a slapshot by teammate Al MacInnis and was diagnosed with a ruptured testicle. Midway through 1999–2000 season Parent was traded to the Tampa Bay Lightning, where he played in a career-high 14 games for the Lightning. The 2000–01 season saw Parent sign as a free agent with the Pittsburgh Penguins. He played 7 games with the Penguins, but played the majority of the season for their affiliate, the Wilkes-Barre/Scranton Penguins.

In July 2001 Parent signed on to play in Germany, playing for Iserlohn, Kassel, Berlin and Hannover before retiring in 2006.

Career statistics

Regular season and playoffs

Awards
 1996: ColHL First Team All-Star
 1996: ColHL Outstanding Goaltender
 1997: James Norris Memorial Trophy (Fewest Goals Allowed in IHL. Shared with Jeff Reese.)

External links
 

1973 births
Living people
Canadian expatriate ice hockey players in Germany
Canadian expatriate ice hockey players in the United States
Canadian ice hockey goaltenders
Detroit Vipers players
Eisbären Berlin players
Fort McMurray Oil Barons players
Hannover Scorpions players
Ice hockey people from Montreal
Iserlohn Roosters players
Kassel Huskies players
Manitoba Moose (IHL) players
Muskegon Fury players
Pittsburgh Penguins players
Rochester Americans players
St. Louis Blues players
Spokane Chiefs players
Tampa Bay Lightning players
Undrafted National Hockey League players
Utah Grizzlies (IHL) players
Vernon Lakers players
Wilkes-Barre/Scranton Penguins players
Worcester IceCats players